Dennis Foggia (born 7 January 2001) is an Italian motorcycle rider who is scheduled to compete in the 2023 Moto2 World Championship, riding for Italtrans Racing Team. He previously competed in Moto3, becoming the 2021 runner-up.

Career

Early career
Foggia made his debut in motorcycle racing at age 15, during the 2016 FIM CEV Moto3 Junior World Championship, riding for the VR46 Riders Academy team, along with Celestino Vietti. In his first ever race, the opening round at Valencia, he finished in second place, and was a regular points scorer throughout the year, finishing 7th in the standings with 79 points, and grabbing a third place podium in the final race of the season, also at Valencia.

For the 2017 season, Foggia stayed with the VR46 Academy team, and dominated the season. Out of the twelve races held that year, Foggia won four races, had nine podiums, and won the championship by 79 points.

Moto3 World Championship

Sky Racing Team VR46 (2016–2019)
His good results in the juniors also earned him three wild-card race appearances in the 2017 Moto3 World Championship, where he finished 14th, 8th and 7th, scoring solid points.

As expected, after his 2017 junior championship and good results in the three wild-card races, Foggia was signed full time by the VR46 Racing Team to partner Nicolò Bulega for the 2018 Moto3 World Championship. Foggia struggled initially, but improved as the season went on, scoring a third place in Aragón, finishing with 55 points, which was only enough for 19th in the standings, but was second best among the rookies.

Staying with the VR46 Academy Team for the 2019 season, Foggia basically replicated last season, scoring one podium again, a third place finish in Aragón. His rookie teammate Celestino Vietti had three podiums, and finished as rookie of the year, scoring 135 points, compared to Foggia's 97. Following the season, through mutual consent between team and rider, Foggia left the VR46 Academy after spending 4 seasons together.

Leopard Racing (2020–2022)
For the 2020 season Foggia moved to Leopard Racing Honda, signing a three year contract, partnering Jaume Masiá. In a shortened season due to the pandemic, Foggia scored 3 podiums, winning the race in Brno. He finished with 89 points, 10th in the standings, but Leopard managed to win the team championship.

Staying with Leopard Racing for his fourth full season in Moto3, for 2021 Foggia was partnered by Xavier Artigas, as Masiá left to join the Red Bull KTM Ajo Team. This would be Foggia's breakout year, as he won 5 races, scoring 10 podiums total, and was contending for the title until the penultimate round, with rookie Pedro Acosta, Masiá's teammate. After an incident with Darryn Binder in the last lap of the Algarve Grand Prix, Foggia could no longer win the title, finishing the year in 2nd place with 216 points.

There were rumours of Foggia leaving Leopard Racing, especially after the Styrian Grand Prix, when his father was locked out of the paddock, with the team reportedly doing so as they believed he was being a bad influence on Foggia, but in the end decided to stay for the 2022 season and honor his contract; despite his earlier comments after the race stating that he wishes to leave. Staying in Moto3 with Leopard Racing, he will be partnered by Tatsuki Suzuki.

Moto2 World Championship

Italtrans Racing Team (from 2023)
From 2023, Foggia graduated to Moto2 World Championship with Italtrans Racing Team.

Career statistics

FIM CEV Moto3 Junior World Championship

Races by year
(key) (Races in bold indicate pole position, races in italics indicate fastest lap)

Grand Prix motorcycle racing

By season

By class

Races by year
(key) (Races in bold indicate pole position, races in italics indicate fastest lap)

References

External links

 

2001 births
Living people
Italian motorcycle racers
Moto3 World Championship riders
Sportspeople from Rome